Moods Of Crime (Hindi: मूड्स ऑफ़ क्रॉइम) is a 2016 Hindi crime thriller featuring Ayaz Ahmed, Anima Pagare and Upekha Jain. Directed, edited and produced by Sunil Shah, it was released on 5 August 2016.

Synopsis
The story is based on the intricacies of the phenomenal capabilities of a human mind. The plot begins with an experiment on criminal psychology and intensifies as this experiment triggers a series of unprecedented crimes which are seemingly motiveless.

 Ayaz Ahmed as Zubin Modi
 Anima Pagare as Nivedita Bhattacharya
 Uppekha Jain as Pooja Desai
 Hemant Dedhia 
 Partho Das
 Nilima Kadhe
 Shyamal Ganguly

References 
 Movie review

 Director's Interview

External links
 https://www.imdb.com/title/tt4839000/

2016 films
2010s Hindi-language films
Indian crime thriller films
2016 crime thriller films